During the 1976 Summer Olympics in Montreal, Quebec, Canada, Morocco, along with many other countries, boycotted due to the participation of New Zealand, which still had sporting links with South Africa.

Athletes from Cameroon, Egypt, Morocco, and Tunisia competed on July 18–20 before these nations withdrew from the Games.

Results by event

Athletics
Men's 5.000 metres
 Mohamed Benbaraka
 Heat — did not start (→ did not advance, no ranking)

Boxing
Men's Light Flyweight (– 48 kg)
 Abderahim Najim
 First Round — Lost to Park Chan-Hee (KOR), DSQ-3

References
Official Olympic Reports

Nations at the 1976 Summer Olympics
1976 Summer Olympics
1976 in Moroccan sport